City is the second studio album by English electronic music group Client, released on 27 September 2004 by Toast Hawaii. The album features guest appearances by Carl Barât and Pete Doherty of The Libertines, as well as Martin L. Gore of Depeche Mode.

Track listing
All songs written by Client.

"Radio" – 4:16
"Come On" – 4:03
"Overdrive" – 3:50
"One Day at a Time" – 4:40
"Cracked" – 0:49
"In It for the Money" – 3:35
"Pornography" – 4:08
"Down to the Underground" – 3:02
"The Chill of October" – 4:52
"Theme" – 2:25
"Don't Call Me Baby" – 4:04
"It's Rock and Roll" – 3:26
"Everything Must End" – 4:40

Personnel
Credits adapted from City album liner notes.

 Client – production
 Carl Barât – additional vocals (7)
 Anne Carruthers – mixing assistant
 DJ Brass – photography
 Pete Doherty – additional vocals (8)
 Louise Downer – artwork design
 Scott Fairbrother – guitar (8)
 Andy Fletcher – executive producer
 Mathieu Gendreau – engineering (Client B's vocals)
 Martin L. Gore – additional vocals (3)
 Matt Nida – web design
 Mandy Parnell – mastering
 Paul Tipler – mixing
 Joe Wilson – producer (all tracks); backing vocals (12)

Release history

References

2004 albums
Client (band) albums
Mute Records albums
Toast Hawaii (record label) albums